Bacchites is a genus of extinct ammonoid cephalopods belonging to the ceratitid family Juvavitidae.

Bacchites, named by  Smith, 1927, has a subspherical shell with the closed umbilicus, the surface of which is almost smooth except for faint transverse ribs, vestigial constrictions, and a faint threadlike keel. The suture is ammonitic.  This  genus, previously included in the Haloritidae, was removed to the Jovavitidae, established by Tozer, 1971, which is based on the genus Jovites. Both families are included in the Tropicaceae.

Bacchites has been found in upper Middle Triassic (Carnian) age sediments in the Alps, Timor,  and California.

References 

 Arkel et al., Mesozoic Ammonoidea; Treatise on Invertebrate Paleontology, Part L, Ammonoidea. Geological Society of America & University of Kansas Press; R. C. Moore (ed)
 Bacchites -PaleoDB

Tropitaceae
Ceratitida genera
Triassic ammonites
Ammonites of Europe
Carnian genera